Jamal Trulove is a San Francisco man framed by police for the 2007 murder of an acquaintance, convicted in 2010, sentenced to 50 years to life, and imprisoned for six years.

A California appeals court overturned his conviction in 2014 and he was retried in 2015 and acquitted. In 2016 he sued the city of San Francisco. In April 2018 a jury found the two officers accused of framing him guilty of fabricating evidence and failing to disclose exculpatory evidence. In 2019 the San Francisco Board of Supervisors voted to approve a settlement of $13.1 million.

Media Appearances 
In 2008, Trulove was selected by a public vote to appear on the VH1 dating show I Love New York 2, where he was nicknamed "Milliown". Tiffany Pollard eliminated him in the first episode.

Trulove appeared in the 2019 film The Last Black Man in San Francisco.

References 

People from San Francisco
Year of birth missing (living people)
Living people